The Sacramento River Cats are a Minor League Baseball team of the Pacific Coast League (PCL) and are the Triple-A affiliate of the San Francisco Giants. Prior to 2015, the River Cats were the Triple-A affiliate of the Oakland Athletics for 15 years. They are based in West Sacramento, California, and play their home games at Sutter Health Park which opened in 2000 and was known as Raley Field through 2019.

Sacramento was previously represented in the Pacific Coast League by the Solons, a charter member of the league which was founded in 1903. Three different versions of the Solons played in California's capital city in 1903, 1905, from 1909 to 1914, from 1918 to 1960, and from 1974 to 1976. The River Cats have played in the PCL since 2000, including the 2021 season in which it was known as the Triple-A West, and are the only charter city to still host a PCL team.

The River Cats have won five PCL championships. Recently they won the league crown in 2019; previously they won back-to-back in 2007 and 2008. They went on to win the Triple-A National Championship Game in all three seasons. Sacramento also won the PCL title in 2003 and 2004.

History
Following the 1999 season, the Pacific Coast League's Vancouver Canadians were purchased by a group led by Art Savage, moved south to West Sacramento, and renamed the River Cats for the 2000 season. Savage was the majority owner of the team until his death at age 58 in November 2009. His widow, Susan Savage, became majority owner after her husband's death.

In 2016, Mike Piazza became the first and only former River Cats player to be inducted into the Baseball Hall of Fame, after earning an 83% vote by the committee. Piazza played three games in Sacramento as part of a 2007 rehab assignment before rejoining the Oakland Athletics.

In conjunction with Major League Baseball's restructuring of Minor League Baseball in 2021, the River Cats were organized into the Triple-A West. They also entered into a new 10-year Professional Development License agreement to remain the Triple-A affiliate of the San Francisco Giants through 2030. Sacramento ended the season in fourth place in the Western Division with a 52–65 record. No playoffs were held to determine a league champion; instead, the team with the best regular-season record was declared the winner. However, 10 games that had been postponed from the start of the season were reinserted into the schedule as a postseason tournament called the Triple-A Final Stretch in which all 30 Triple-A clubs competed for the highest winning percentage. Sacramento finished the tournament tied for 20th place with a 4–6 record. In 2022, the Triple-A West became known as the Pacific Coast League, the name historically used by the regional circuit prior to the 2021 reorganization.

In August 2022, owner Susan Savage sold a majority interest in the team to the Sacramento Kings.

Season-by-season records

Attendance

After arriving at Raley Field, the River Cats led minor leagues in attendance during each of its first nine seasons.  In 2015, the team drew 672,354 fans in 72 home games, leading the minor league in total attendance. In 2015, they also drew the second highest attendance per game in the minors with an average of 9,338 fans per game. In 2017, the team drew 562,237 fans in 70 home games, placing them third in overall attendance for the Pacific Coast League for the season. In 2018, the River Cats drew their lowest attendance since arriving at Raley Field with 538,785 fans attending 70 home games. While this was the team's lowest attendance since arriving in West Sacramento, it was strong enough to place them fifth in attendance for the Pacific Coast League for the 2018 season.

Playoff history
The River Cats have won 12 division titles, including back-to-back titles in 2000 and 2001, three years in a row from 2003 to 2005, and six consecutive titles from 2007 to 2012. In 2019, the River Cats snapped a six-year playoff drought by winning the Pacific Northern Division. 

They won back-to-back league championships in 2003 and 2004 and again in 2007 and 2008.

In 2007, they went on to defeat the Richmond Braves in that year's Bricktown Showdown by a score of 7–1. The River Cats repeated in 2008, defeating the Scranton/Wilkes-Barre Yankees, 4–1.

Roster

Players
See: :Category:Sacramento River Cats players

References

External links

 
 Statistics from Baseball-Reference

 
River
Professional baseball teams in California
Pacific Coast League teams
West Sacramento, California
Oakland Athletics minor league affiliates
San Francisco Giants minor league affiliates
Baseball teams established in 2000
2000 establishments in California
Triple-A West teams